Alexandr Ivanovich Vvedensky (August 30, 1889 – July 26, 1946) was one of the leaders of the Living Church movement (Живая Церковь, also known as the Renovationist Church, Обновленческая Церковь), a movement of the Russian Orthodox Church from 1922 to 1946 to reform the Russian Church life; he is considered the person "most identified with renovationism in the Soviet era" and is considered a heretic by the Russian Orthodox Church.

He should not be confused with the Russian poet of the same name.

Background
Vvedensky's paternal grandfather was according to unclear data a Jewish convert to Christianity and served as a psalmist (cantor) in the diocese of Novgorod the Great. In the process of converting his grandfather changed his surname to Vvedenskii after Vvedenie, the feast of the Presentation of the Virgin.  Alexander's mother was a member of the provincial bourgeoisie and his father became a nobleman and was headmaster of a school at Vitebsk.

Vvedensky was born in Vitebsk in 1889. He graduated from the History department of St. Petersburg University in 1913. While a student at St. Petersburg, he played the piano and frequented the salon of Dmitrii Merezhkovskii and Zinaida Gippius, important figures in the symbolist movement.  With their encouragement, he wrote an article entitled "Reasons for Non-belief among the Russian Intelligentsia,” published in the journal Palomnik, finding that the two main reasons for non-belief were
The disparity between Christian dogma and scientific knowledge and
The reactionary nature of the Orthodox clergy.

His desire to bridge the gap between religion and science and be an apologist and reformer of the church is seen throughout his subsequent career.

Vvedensky decided to enter the priesthood in 1910 and, as unmarried priests were forced to take monastic vows, he married prior to his ordination, though accusations of marital infidelity plagued him for the rest of his life. He  received a diploma from the St. Petersburg Spiritual Academy in 1914, but was refused ordination due to his Jewish background and perception in intellectualism. He was finally ordained by the head Chaplain of the Army, Georgy Shavelsky, as a regimental chaplain in July 1914.

Vvedensky and the Living Church, 19221923
In May 1922, Vvedensky and other priests of the Living Church movement were brought to Moscow with the assistance of the GPU. Vvedensky and two others met on May 10 in the Grebnevskii Church on Lubyanka Square with the church's pastor, Fr. Sergei Kalinsky. They agreed to collaborate for the support among the Moscow clergy. Simultaneously supporting Archbishop Antonin Granovsky, the head of the movement to gain adherents in the provinces. The other goal of their agenda was to arrange the meeting with the Patriarch in an effort to end what they saw as counterrevolutionary activity on the part of the church. They typed up an appeal at the Military-Revolutionary Council which was certified by Trotsky’s personal secretary and, on May 12, distributed by Stalin to the Politburo, which approved it - in fact, the only type-written archival copy was signed by Stalin, Zinoviev, Kamenev, Molotov, Mikhail Tomsky, and Aleksey Rykov.

The same evening of the Politburo meeting, Vvedensky with several other renovationist priests confronted Patriarch Tikhon, at that time under his house arrest, with evidence that his anti-Soviet activities were leading to chaos in the Church. Tikhon denied such anti-Soviet activity, but readily agreed to step down from the patriarchal throne, and handed authority temporarily over to Metropolitan Agafangel of Yaroslavl until the new council could be convened to elect a new patriarch. Several days later, they got Tikhon to agree that the patriarchal chancellery should be run by the Living Church movement, yet he stipulated to have that be overseen by other two bishops. However, upon leaving the meeting, Vvedensky reported publicly that the Patriarch had approved the renovationist's council as being the proper church administration until the national council could be convened for the election of a new Patriarch.  Archbishop Antonin Granovsky was named the president of the council with Vvedensky as the vice-president.

When Vvedensky met with Metropolitan Veniamin of Petrograd in late May, the metropolitan refused to accept the VTsU as the rightful administration of the church without direct instructions from the Patriarch. In a letter to all parishes in his diocese, Metropolitan Veniamin forbade Vvedensky and other renovationist priests from performing the sacraments before they had repented before him. That led to the arrest of Metropolitan of Petrograd the next day after the letter was released, and Vvedensky's presence at that arrest was compared with Judas Iscariot at the arrest of Christ.  Veniamin's successor, Alexy Simansky, restored Vvedensky and the others to their rights on June 4 under the pressure from the GPU, which threatened to execute Veniamin.

Vvedensky as Head of the Living Church, 1923-1946
Vvedensky was essentially the head of the Living Church from the 1920s. During that time he adopted a series of titles — Metropolitan; Apologete; Evangelizer; Deputy of the First Hierarch. On October 10, 1941, he was named as the "First Hierarch of the Russian Orthodox Church in the USSR" with the title of the "Most Holy and Blessed Lord and Father" and in essence the head of the Living Church. He attempted to have himself to be named as the Patriarch, but that was never accepted by the majority of the church and by December of that year, he reverted to his less representative title of Metropolitan.

With Stalin's concordat with the "Patriarchal" Russian Orthodox Church after his meeting with Metropolitan Sergey on September 8, 1943, the Living Church lost the support of the Soviet authorities and the rest of the faithful. Many clergy were allowed back into their respective churches at the rank they had before joining the Living Church, except for Vvedensky, who as the "founding father" of the schism was to be laicized. He refused, and died unreconciled.

Personal life
Vvedensky was married twice and had five children. As a member of the "white clergy" (married clergy), he was canonically forbidden to enter the episcopate, which in the Eastern Church is made up of the "black clergy" (monastic clergy) (the exception is when the white priest is a widower, in which case he is not allowed to remarry and is expected to become a monk). Vvedensky also shaved his beard later in life, something not traditionally done by Orthodox clergymen. Margaret Bourke-White took a series of pictures of "the New Metropolitan of Moscow" during her visit to Moscow in 1941 and they were published in Life Magazine.

Vvedensky died of a stroke on July 26, 1946, and is buried at the Kalitnikov Cemetery in Moscow.

Notes

References
Roslof, Edward E., Red Priests: Renovationism, Russian Orthodoxy, & Revolution, 1905-1946, Indiana University Press, Bloomington, 2002.

1889 births
1946 deaths
People from Vitebsk
Russian religious leaders